Sapir is a surname. Notable people with the surname include:

André Sapir, Belgian economist
Edward Sapir, American anthropologist and linguist
J. David Sapir, his son, also an anthropologist and linguist
Esteban Sapir, Argentine cinematographer and director
Estelle Sapir, Polish Holocaust survivor
Gal Sapir, Israeli footballer
Jacques Sapir, French economist
Mark Sapir, Russian-American mathematician
Pinchas Sapir, Israeli politician
Richard Sapir, American novelist
Tamir Sapir, American businessman
Yosef Sapir, Israeli politician
Michael Sapir , Sapir Real Estate Development is an American Real Estate Developer and Real Estate Billionaire in 2016.

See also
Sapir (disambiguation)

Hebrew-language surnames
Jewish surnames
Surnames from ornamental names